The Son of Monte Cristo is a 1940 American black-and-white swashbuckling adventure film from United Artists, produced by Edward Small, directed by Rowland V. Lee, that stars Louis Hayward, Joan Bennett, and George Sanders. The Small production uses the same sets and many of the same cast and production crew as his previous year's production of The Man in the Iron Mask. Hayward returned to star in Small's The Return of Monte Cristo (1946).

The film takes the same name as the unofficial sequel to The Count of Monte Cristo, namely The Son of Monte Cristo, written by Jules Lermina in 1881.
Using elements from several romantic swashbucklers of the time such as The Prisoner of Zenda and The Mark of Zorro the production also mirrors the situation of Continental Europe in 1939–1940.

Plot
In 1865, the proletarian General Gurko Lanen (George Sanders) becomes the behind-the-scenes dictator of the Grand Duchy of Lichtenburg located in the Balkans. Gurko suppresses the clergy and the free press and imprisons the Prime Minister Baron Von Neuhoff (Montagu Love).  The rightful ruler of the Grand Duchy, the Grand Duchess Zona (Joan Bennett), hopes to get aid from Napoleon III of France and makes her escape pursued by a troop of Hussars loyal to Gurko. While on a hunting trip, the visiting Count of Monte Cristo (Louis Hayward), rescues her. The Count escorts the Grand Duchess Zona to a neutral country, but Gurko's Hussars violate international neutrality to return the Grand Duchess and her lady-in-waiting back to Lichtenburg.

The count has become romantically enamored of Zona and undertakes to help her, visiting the Grand Duchy where he falls in with the underground resistance movement of Lichtenburg. He befriends the loyal Lt. Dorner (Clayton Moore) of the palace guard who knows a variety of secret passages leading from the Grand Ducal Palace to the literal catacombs of the Grand Duchy.

Discovering that Baron Von Neuhoff is to be executed, the Count gains entry to the palace through his previously being asked for a large loan of French Francs by Gurko and plays the role of a cowardly fopish international banker. There he overhears Gurko meeting with the French Ambassador (Georges Renavent) who raises the issue of human rights in the Grand Duchy. Gurko counters him by saying he is signing a non aggression pact with Russia protecting Lichtenburg from any French threats. Gurko schemes to gain the nation's loyalty by marrying the Grand Duchess and keeping the pact with Russia a secret.

The count becomes a masked freedom fighter named "The Torch" after the underground newspaper in order to save the Grand Duchy. He then sets out to right the wrongs and capture the heart of the woman he loves.

Cast
 Louis Hayward as Edmond Dantès, Jr.
 Joan Bennett as Grand Duchess Zona 
 George Sanders as Gen. Gurko Lanen 
 Florence Bates as Countess Mathilde  
 Lionel Royce as Col. Zimmerman  
 Montagu Love as Baron Von Neuhoff  
 Ian Wolfe as Conrad Stadt  
 Clayton Moore as Lt. Fritz Dorner  
 Ralph Byrd as William Gluck  
 Georges Renavent as French Ambassador  
 Michael Visaroff as Prince Pavlov  
 Rand Brooks as Hans Mirbach  
 Theodore Von Eltz as Captain  
 James Seay as Lieutenant  
 Henry Brandon as Sgt. Schultz  
 Jack Mulhall as Schmidt  
 Edward Keane as Turnkey  
 Stanley Andrews as Turnkey 
 Charles Trowbridge as Priest 
 Wyndham Standing as Chamberlain 
 Lionel Belmore as Hercules Snyder 
 Ted Billings as Townsman (uncredited) 
 Dwight Frye as Pavlov's Secretary (uncredited) 
 Lawrence Grant as The Baron (uncredited)

Production
A sequel to The Count of Monte Cristo was announced almost immediately after the first film's success. At one stage Robert Donat, Melvyn Douglas and Douglas Fairbanks Jr. were named as stars; Jean Arthur was also being considered for a lead role.

Reception
The Son of Monte Cristo was widely panned by critics. Bosley Crowther of The New York Times called the film "just a routine retelling of a conventional sword-and-cape adventure tale" and "a juvenile masquerade, acted as such and strangely suggestive of a Flash Gordon serial in costume. The old Count should turn in his grave". Variety called it, "... (a) plodding offspring of a famed father ... Director Rowland V. Lee must share the pillory with writer George Bruce for 'The Son', although Louis Hayward and Joan Bennett in the top roles are not far from the stocks".

Harrison's Reports wrote: "Patrons who remember how entertaining was 'The Count of Monte Cristo' may flock to the box-office to see this picture. But if they expect to find this as exciting as the first, they will be disappointed. The story is routine and the plot developments obvious; moreover, even though the players try hard, they are not very convincing". Film Daily wrote: "Picture should entertain the average audience, although it has several faults. The dialogue is static in places and the situations are telegraphed. In addition, Miss Bennett and George Sanders are not overly animated in their characterizations". John Mosher of The New Yorker wrote: The Son of Monte Cristo seems to be arranged for young persons, or for those of arrested mental development, who also should have a place in our considerations at this season".

Awards
The film was nominated for an Academy Award for Best Art Direction by John DuCasse Schulze and Edward G. Boyle.

Quotes
"When the spirit of justice is crushed in one country, men will rise to defend it in all countries" - Baron Von Neuhoff

References

Notes

Bibliography

 Hanson, Patricia King, ed. The American Film Institute Catalog of Motion Pictures Produced in the United States: Feature Films, 1931-1940. Berkeley, California: University of California Press, 1993. .
 Richards, Jeffrey. Swordsmen of the Screen: From Douglas Fairbanks to Michael York. London: Routledge, 1977. .

External links

 
 
 
 
 Jules Lermina's Son of Monte Cristo

1940 films
1940s adventure films
American adventure films
American black-and-white films
American swashbuckler films
Films directed by Rowland V. Lee
United Artists films
Films set in Europe
Films set in 1865
Films set in a fictional country
Films based on The Count of Monte Cristo
Films produced by Edward Small
1940s English-language films
1940s American films